Bob DeVos (born 1946) is an American jazz guitarist.

Career
His style combines blues, rhythm and blues, and jazz. "I wanted to play like B.B. King and Chuck Berry", DeVos said. At twelve, he began playing guitar, trying to figure out solos from his brother's R&B records. He took lessons from Joe Cinderella. In high school he became interested in jazz after hearing albums by organist Jimmy Smith with guitarist Kenny Burrell and the album The Incredible Jazz Guitar of Wes Montgomery. After graduating, he went on tour with Frankie Valli and the Four Seasons and took lessons from  Harry Leahey and Dennis Sandole. In 1969 he got a job with Trudy Pitts after it was vacated by Pat Martino. Beginning in the late 1970s, he was a member of bands led by Gerry Niewood, Teo Macero, Jimmy McGriff, and Charles Earland. Earland produced his first album for Savant. He has also worked with Harry Allen, Freddy Cole, Junior Cook, Joey DeFrancesco, Kenny Drew Jr., Etta Jones, Gene Ludwig, Ron McClure, David "Fathead" Newman, Greg Osby, Houston Person, Irene Reid, Dr. Lonnie Smith, Dave Stryker, and Stanley Turrentine.

Discography

As leader
 Breaking the Ice (Savant, 1999) with Charles Earland
 DeVos' Groove Guitar! (Blues Leaf, 2003) with Gene Ludwig, Billy James
 Shifting Sands (Savant, 2006) with Eric Alexander
 Playing for Keeps (Savant, 2007) with Eric Alexander
 Shadow Box (American Showplace Music, 2013) with Ralph Bowen 
 Six String Solos (American Showplace Music, 2016)

As sideman
 Charles Earland, Blowing the Blues Away (HighNote, 1997)
 Charles Earland, Charles Earland Live (Cannonball, 1999)
 Onaje Allan Gumbs, Sack Full of Dreams (18th & Vine, 2007)
 Richard "Groove" Holmes, Good Vibrations (Muse, 1980)
 Gene Ludwig, The Groove ORGANization (Blues Leaf, 2002) with Billy James
 Gene Ludwig Trio with Bill Warfield Big Band, Duff's Blues (18th & Vine, 2008)
 Teo Macero, Impressions of Charles Mingus (Palo Alto, 1983)
 Ron McClure, Match Point (SteepleChase, 2002)
 Ron McClure, Age of Peace (SteepleChase, 2003)
 Irene Reid, Million Dollar Secret (Savant, 1997)
 Irene Reid, I Ain't Doing Too Bad (Savant, 1999)
 Vince Seneri, Urban Paradise (Senful/Orchard, 2003)
 Vince Seneri, Street Talk (Senful/Orchard, 2005) 
 Tyrone Smith, Playing It By Ear (18th & Vine, 2010)
 Akiko Tsuruga, Sakura (American Showplace Music, 2011)
 Reuben Wilson Trio, Revisited (American Showplace Music, 2011)

References

External links
 Official site

1946 births
Living people
American jazz guitarists
Musicians from Paterson, New Jersey
Guitarists from New Jersey
American male guitarists
20th-century American guitarists
20th-century American male musicians
American male jazz musicians